Henry de Puyjalon (15 March 1841, in Floirac, Lot, France – 18 August 1905, in l'île à la Chasse, Havre-Saint-Pierre, Mingan Archipelago, Canada) was a late 19th-century scientist and explorer. He explored the north coast of the Saint Lawrence River, and was one of the first Canadian ecologists to suggest wildlife and marine conservation areas.

Puyjalon graduated with a Bachelor of Science degree from the University of Toulouse and emigrated to Quebec in 1874. He became a hunter, trapper, ornithologist, geologist and naturalist, and in 1880, a Quebec government employee with the task to explore for mineral wealth within Labrador. He became a Canadian citizen in 1888, and for the next three years the lighthouse keeper of Parrot Island on the Mingan Archipelago.

In 1897 Puyjalon was appointed Quebec's Inspector General of Fisheries and Wildlife, and used this position to encourage the government to establish protected marine areas and to publicise the dangers of over-exploitation, particularly through his books and technical literature.

The political opinions of Henry de Puyjalon are unknown, but he was friend with members of the Institut canadien de Montréal thus, Henry would have been very close to the Parti Rouge.

An episode of the television series A Scattering of Seeds featured Puyjalon.

Family

In 1882, Henry was wed to Angelina Ouimet in Québec city; together they had 2 sons.

Bibliography
Le Petit guide du chercheur de minéraux (1892)___(Rough English translation) The little guide of mineral hunter
Le Guide du chasseur de pelleterie (1893(Rough English translation) The guide for the pelts dressing hunter
Labrador et géographie (1893)(Rough English translation) Labrador (North Est Quebec for Him) and Geography
Récits du Labrador (1894)__(Rough English translation) Popular tales of Labrador ( N.E.Q. for Him)
Histoire naturelle (1900)__(Rough English translation) Natural History

Further reading
French Wikipedia
Puyjalon, Henry de.  Récits du Labrador. Introduction, notes and chronology by Daniel Chartier (2007). Montréal, Imaginaire

References

External links
 

French Quebecers
Canadian naturalists
French naturalists
1841 births
1905 deaths
University of Toulouse alumni